FC Nizhny Novgorod was an association football club based in Nizhny Novgorod, Russia. It played three seasons in the Russian First Division.

In December 2007 a new team formed from an amateur team playing in the regional championship.

The team entered the Amateur Football League and got promoted to the Russian Second Division. The team entered Russian First Division for 2009 despite not qualifying in 2008 after several clubs ahead of them were unable to participate for financial reasons despite finishing 3rd in Zone Volga Region.

In 2012 it was merged into FC Volga Nizhny Novgorod.

Defunct football clubs in Russia
Association football clubs established in 2007
Association football clubs disestablished in 2012
Sport in Nizhny Novgorod
 
2007 establishments in Russia
2012 disestablishments in Russia